BC Cannabis Stores is a crown corporation chain of retail outlets operated by the British Columbia Liquor Distribution Branch to distribute cannabis products in the Canadian province of British Columbia. Unlike BC Liquor Stores, BC Cannabis Stores operates an online store for consumers.

History
It was established on October 17, 2018, following the introduction of the Cannabis Act, which legalized recreational cannabis use across Canada. Lower Mainland locations began to open in late 2020.

Michael Tan, executive director of cannabis operations for the BCLDB, said that “social-responsibility messaging was key for the branch, particularly ensuring customers know about keeping product away from youth, not driving high and abiding by possession limits."

References

External links
Official website of BC Cannabis Stores

Cannabis distribution retailers of Canada
Cannabis in British Columbia
Cannabis shops in Canada
Crown corporations of British Columbia
2018 establishments in British Columbia